Ken Rahjes (May 16, 1966) is an American politician from the state of Kansas. A Republican, Rahjes is a member of the Kansas House of Representatives, representing the 110th district.

Rahjes was appointed to the Kansas House in January 2016, following the resignation of Travis Couture-Lovelady. He was reelected in 2018.

References

External links

Living people
Republican Party members of the Kansas House of Representatives
21st-century American politicians
1966 births